The Journal of Plant Research is a bimonthly peer-reviewed scientific journal of botany published on behalf of the  by Springer Science+Business Media. Its predecessor,  of Tokyo, first published in 1887, ran until volume 105 in 1992; during this period, over 4,900 plant names were first published in its pages. The journal obtained its current name in 1995.

Abstracting and indexing

The journal is abstracted and indexed in:

According to the Journal Citation Reports, the journal has a 2020 impact factor of 2.629.

See also
Journal of Japanese Botany
Acta Phytotaxonomica et Geobotanica

References

External links

Archive at Biodiversity Heritage Library (1887–1922, vol. 1–36)

Archive at J-STAGE (1887–1971, vol. 1–84)

Botany journals
Springer Science+Business Media
Academic journals of Japan
Publications established in 1887
English-language journals
Bimonthly journals